Euzaphleges longurio is an extinct, superficially mackerel-like fish related to the escolar and snake mackerels.  Euzaphleges was found off the coast of what is now California during the late Miocene.  It was smaller than the very similar Thyrsocles and longer and more slender than Zaphlegulus, which also lived at the same time.  It was much longer than the poorly known Trossulus.

See also
 List of prehistoric bony fish

References

Euzaphlegidae
Miocene fish of North America